Anitra Thorhaug is an American marine biologist, plant ecophysiologist and a chemical oceanographer whose extensive work on the rehabilitation of coastal ecosystems has had a substantial influence on national and international policies on conservation around the world. She is President of the Greater Caribbean Energy and Environment Foundation, and President of the Institute for Seagrasses. She has had a series of professorships at leading Universities and presently works at The Institute of Sustainable Forestry Ecophysiological Laboratories at the Yale School of Forestry & Environmental Studies. She is a member of the International Club of Rome and has twice been President of the US Association of the Club of Rome.

Education 

Thorhaug studied biology at Smith College, the University of Chicago, Roosevelt University and the University of Oslo in Norway and was awarded a BSc by the University of Miami in 1963. She received an MSc in marine biology from the Rosenstiel School of Marine and Atmospheric Sciences at the University of Miami in 1965. She carried out research on artificial and living single-cell marine algae membranes at RSMAS and Hopkins Marine Station of Stanford University for which she was awarded a PhD in 1969. Her post-doctoral work (1969-1971) on living plasma membranes using a non-equilibrium thermodynamic framework included work at the Weizmann Institute with Aharon Katchalsky, and at UCLA with Jack Dainty, while continuing to be advised technically by Lawrence R. Blinks of Hopkins Marine Station.

Career 

Academically, Dr. Thorhaug has been associated with a number of leading universities and research institutions around the world, including the University of California, Berkeley, the Stanford Hopkins Marine Stations, Rosenstiel School of Marine and Atmospheric Sciences, Florida International University, the Weizmann Institute and UCLA and is currently conducting research into photosynthesis and remote sensing of marine plants at the Ecophysiological Laboratories at the Yale School of Forestry and Environmental Studies. She has worked for a number of United Nations Agencies including the World Bank and the Food and Agriculture Organization, the International Oceanographic Commission of the UN Educational, Scientific and Cultural Organization, the UN Environment Program and the UN Development Program. In the United States, she has worked for and advised the Department of Energy, National Oceanic and Atmospheric Administration, National Science Foundation, and Seagrant and has held offices in national scientific associations such as Chair of Physiology of the Botanical Society of America. Thorhaug has also worked with private foundations such as the Mobil Oil Foundation, Mitchell Foundation and the Rockefeller Family Foundation.  She is the author of eleven books and more than two hundred scientific publications.

Honors and awards 

Thorhaug received the United Nations Environmental Program Gold Medal in 1982, was included in the UNEP Global 500 list in 1987, received the Earth Trustee Award from UNCED in 1991 and was featured in UNEP's Who's Who Women in Environment in 2006. She is a member of the Club of Rome and was President of the United States Association of the Club of Rome twice. She has received a Lifetime Legacy Award from the Botanical Society of America, a Lindbergh Award and a BSA Diamond Award as well as numerous national and international awards and grans and was awarded an honorary doctorate by the Philippines Women's University in 1994.

References 

American marine biologists
American oceanographers
American physiologists
Rosenstiel School of Marine and Atmospheric Science alumni
Club of Rome members
Smith College alumni
University of Chicago alumni
Ecophysiologist
Plant physiologists
Women physiologists
Women marine biologists